Edward King may refer to:

Politicians
 Edward J. King (1925–2006), Governor of Massachusetts, 1979–1983
 Edward King, 1st Earl of Kingston (1726–1797), Anglo-Irish politician and peer
 Edward King (Irish politician), MP for Carrick, 1781–1793
 Edward King (Ohio politician) (1795–1836), twice Speaker of the Ohio House and co-founder and on first faculty of Cincinnati Law School
 Edward Bolton King (1800–1878), British Liberal Party politician, MP for Warwick 1830–1837, South Warwickshire 1857–59
 Edward John King (1867–1929), U.S. Representative from Illinois
 Edward King (Parliamentarian) (1606–1681), English lawyer and politician
 Ed King (mayor), mayor of Mount Pleasant, Iowa, who was assassinated during a 1986 city council meeting

Sportsmen
 Eddie King (British runner) (born 1976), British runner and finalist at the 1999 IAAF World Indoor Championships – Men's 1500 metres
 Eddie King (Canadian runner) (1911–1994), Canadian Olympic athlete
 Eddie King (ice hockey) (1885–1970), Canadian ice hockey player
 Eddie King (footballer, born 1914) (1914–1993), English-born football defender who played for Tottenham Hotspur
 Eddie King (footballer, born 1890) (1890–?), English football right half
 Ed King (American football) (born 1969), former football player
 Eddie King (jockey), horse racing jockey who won the 2005 Rumson Stakes
 Edward King (rower) (born 1989), American rower
 Ted King (cyclist) (born 1983), American cyclist

Musicians
 Ed King (1949–2018), American musician; member of Lynyrd Skynyrd
 Edward T. King, early 20th-century musician and Zon-o-phone, Victor and Columbia executive
 Eddie King (musician) (1938–2012), American blues guitarist

Writers
 Edward King (British poet) (1612–1637)
 Edward King (antiquarian) (1735?–1807), English barrister and writer
 Edward King (author) (1848–1896), American journalist and author

Military figures
 Edward King (Royal Navy officer) (1774–1807), captain during the Napoleonic Wars
 Edward Leonard King (1873–1933), American football player and coach; general in U.S. Army
 Edward P. King (1884–1958), American major general who led US forces on Bataan during World War II
 Edward Durnford King (1771–1862), Royal Navy officer

Religious figures
 Edward King (bishop of Elphin) (died 1639), Anglican bishop in Ireland
 Edward King (bishop of Lincoln) (1829–1910), Anglican bishop in England
 Edward King (priest) (1920–1998), Anglican clergyman

Others
 Edward King (jurist) (1794–1873), jurist twice nominated to the United States Supreme Court
 Edward King, Viscount Kingsborough (1795–1837), Irish antiquarian
 Edward King (New York banker) (1833–1908), American banker
 Edward Skinner King (1861–1931), American astronomer

See also
Ed King (activist)
King Edward (disambiguation)